Petra Behle (born Petra Schaaf on 5 January 1969 in Offenbach am Main) is a former German biathlete.

Career 
Behle won her first gold medal in the 1988 World Championships when she was 19 and she also has three gold medals in the 15 km that happened in 1989, 1991 and 1993 she also has three biathlon-world championship medals in relays from 1995, 1996 and 1997. She has 1 gold and 2 silver medals from olympic relays silver in 1992 and 1994 and gold medal from 1998. And she also has two team world championship gold medals from Novosibirsk in 1992 and Ruhpolding in 1996. She was married to Jochen Behle.

References

External links
 
 

German female biathletes
1969 births
Living people
Schaaf, Petra
Schaaf, Petra
Biathletes at the 1998 Winter Olympics
Olympic medalists in biathlon
Biathlon World Championships medalists
Medalists at the 1998 Winter Olympics
Medalists at the 1994 Winter Olympics
Medalists at the 1992 Winter Olympics
Olympic biathletes of Germany
Olympic gold medalists for Germany
Olympic silver medalists for Germany
Sportspeople from Offenbach am Main
20th-century German women